The Santeetlah dusky salamander (Desmognathus santeetlah) is a species of salamander in the family Plethodontidae.
It is endemic to the United States.

Its natural habitats are rivers, intermittent rivers, and freshwater springs. It is threatened by habitat loss.

References

Amphibians of the United States
Desmognathus
Taxonomy articles created by Polbot
Amphibians described in 1981